Oradectes (meaning "margin biter", from Latin ora (margin) and dectes (biter)) is an extinct genus of diadectid reptiliomorph. It is known from a single partial skeleton collected from the Early Permian Cutler Formation of Colorado in the United States. The type species, O. sanmiguelensis, was originally named as a species of Diadectes in 1965. It was given its own genus in 2010.

Description
The only material belonging to Oradectes is a partial skeleton known as MCZ 2989. This skeleton includes a complete skull, neck vertebrae, a partial pectoral girdle, the right forelimb, and some ribs. The skull is robust with spade-shaped teeth lining the jaws. The front teeth of the lower jaw protrude outward. A ventral border of the Meckelian fenestra of the lower jaw formed entirely from the splenial bone is a distinguishing feature of Oradectes found in no other diadectid.

Classification
Oradectes sanmiguelensis was described by Lewis and Vaughn (1965) as a species of Diadectes, D. sanmiguelensis. In a 2005 phylogenetic study of diadectids, D. sanmiguelensis was found to be one of the most basal diadectids and was placed far from a clade containing most of the other species of Diadectes. A 2010 analysis came up with the same results and assigned D. sanmiguelensis to the new genus Oradectes. Below is a cladogram from the 2010 study showing the phylogenetic position of Oradectes:

References

Diadectids
Cisuralian tetrapods of North America
Permian Colorado
Paleontology in Colorado
Fossil taxa described in 2010